Pimelea bracteata, is a species of flowering plant in the family Thymelaeaceae and is endemic to the south-west of New South Wales. It is a shrub with narrowly egg-shaped to elliptic leaves and pendulous, pale green heads of pale yellow flowers.

Description
The leaves are glabrous, the upper surface sometimes purplish and the lower surface a paler shade of green. Flowering occurs from November to February.

Taxonomy
This pimealea was first formally described in 1902 by Joseph Maiden and Ernst Betche who gave it the name Pimelea ligustrina var. glabra in the Proceedings of the Linnean Society of New South Wales. In 1983 S. Threlfall raised the variety to Pimelea bracteata in the journal Brunonia. The specific epithet (bracteata) means "bracteate".

Distribution and habitat
Pimelea bracteata grows along watercourses and in damp places at altitudes above  near Kiandra in the Snowy Mountains of New South Wales.

Conservation status
Pimelea bracteata is listed as "critically endangered" under the Australian Government Environment Protection and Biodiversity Conservation Act 1999 and the New South Wales Government Biodiversity Conservation Act 2016. The main threats to the species are disease and habitat fragmentation caused by Phytophthora infection, and the drying of the local environment.

References

bracteata
Flora of New South Wales
Malvales of Australia
Plants described in 1902
Taxa named by Carl Meissner
Taxa named by Joseph Maiden
Taxa named by Ernst Betche